The 2011 Indoor Football League season was the third season of the Indoor Football League (IFL). The regular season began on Saturday, February 19, 2011, with the Kickoff Classic game, and ended on Sunday, June 12, 2011. After three weeks of playoffs, and one week off, the playoffs ended with the 2011 United Bowl on July 16 where the Sioux Falls Storm defeated the Tri-Cities Fever 37-10.

Final regular season standings

United Conference

Intense Conference

z - clinched conference title

y - clinched division title

x - clinched playoff spot

Playoffs

Awards

Individual season awards

References